Charles M. Weber III served in California's 11th State Assembly district from March 25, 1935 - January 8, 1951. During World War I he served in the United States Army.

References

United States Army personnel of World War I
Members of the California State Legislature
1893 births
1987 deaths
California Republicans
California Independents
Members of the California State Assembly